Hum Hain Na is an Indian television drama show which premiered on 1 September 2014. It was replaced by Dil Ki Baatein Dil Hi Jaane from 23 March 2015.

Hum Hain Na is set in Varanasi and portrays the relationship of main character Shivprasad Mishra, nicknamed "Bunty", with his relatives. Sony Entertainment Television marketed Hum Hain Na as a "man-centric" show. Lead actor Kanwar Dhillon stated that the show was intended to be different from other television dramas which tended to focus on the relationship between mothers-in-law and daughters-in-law. The hundredth episode of the show was broadcast on 2 February 2015.

Cast
Kanwar Dhillon as Shivprasad "Bunty" Mishra
Pratyusha Banerjee as Sagarika Chattopadhyay
Shubhangi Gokhale as Laxmi Mishra / Ammaji
Rajendra Chawla as Bhola Shankar Mishra / Babuji
Ketaki Kadam / Vinny Arora as Satya
Manmohan Tiwari as Rameshwar Mishra
Ashiesh Roy as Mr. Chattopadhyay
Sharhaan Singh  as Resham Singh

References

External links

Sony Entertainment Television original programming